Jansen is a village in the Canadian province of Saskatchewan within the Rural Municipality of Prairie Rose No. 309 and Census Division No. 10. The village is located along Highway 16 150 km east of the City of Saskatoon. Jansen is home to Zion Lutheran Church. It has a Community Hall and Summer Recreation Complex as well as a five-pin bowling alley. The C.M Buckaway Library is Jansen's public library.

Jansen has a thriving Kinsmen and Kinette club. They host bi-annual community suppers called steak frys and celebrate Canada Day with a large event.

History 
Jansen incorporated as a village on October 19, 1908. Jansen was named for Nebraska rancher Peter Jansen.

Demographics 

Education

Children are bused to nearby Lanigan for primary and secondary school.

Notable people

Hockey players Brian Propp, Ken Schinkel, Byron Briske, and Shannon Briske all lived here as children.
Author and Poet C.M. Buckaway, for whom the local library is named, lived in Jansen.

See also 

 List of communities in Saskatchewan
 Villages of Saskatchewan

References

External links

Villages in Saskatchewan
Wolverine No. 340, Saskatchewan
Division No. 10, Saskatchewan